Grete Nordrå (22 November 1924 – 13 March 2012) was a Norwegian actress who appeared on screen from the 1950s onwards. She was born in Asker.

She made her screen debut in 1955 when she appeared in Trost i taklampa. Over the next 35 years, her roles were few and far between, but in 1990 she appeared as a Norwegian witch in the film adaptation of Roald Dahl's The Witches, and her screen appearances since then have been more frequent, though still mostly on Norwegian television. Her biggest commercial success was co-starring in 2003's Mors Elling as the mother of title character. She was nominated for an Amanda Award for her performance. She died in 2012 in Bergen.

Filmography

References

1924 births
2012 deaths
Norwegian film actresses
Norwegian television actresses
People from Asker